Yarijan-e Olya may refer to:
 Yarijan-e Olya, Kermanshah
 Yarijan-e Olya, West Azerbaijan